The 1949 Kentucky Wildcats football team represented the University of Kentucky in the 1949 college football season. The Wildcats' were led by head coach Bear Bryant in his fourth season and finished the season with a record of nine wins and three losses (9–3 overall, 4–1 in the SEC).

Schedule

References

Kentucky
Kentucky Wildcats football seasons
Kentucky Wildcats football